50th Avenue was a Chicago 'L' station on the Douglas branch of the Chicago Transit Authority's West-Northwest Route, currently known as the Pink Line. The station was located at 50th Avenue and 21st Place in west suburban Cicero. The station closed in 1978 and it was moved to the Illinois Railway Museum where it is preserved.

References

Defunct Chicago "L" stations
Railway stations in the United States opened in 1910
Railway stations closed in 1978
Cicero, Illinois
Railway stations in Cook County, Illinois
1910 establishments in Illinois
1978 disestablishments in Illinois